Delegation is the assignment of authority to another person (normally from a manager to a subordinate) to carry out specific activities. It is the process of distributing and entrusting work to another person, and therefore one of the core concepts of management leadership. The process involves managers deciding which work they should do themselves and which work should be delegated to others for completion. From a managerial standpoint, delegation involves shifting project responsibility to team members, giving them the opportunity to finalize the work product effectively, with minimal intervention. The opposite of effective delegation is micromanagement, where a manager provides too much input, direction, and review of delegated work. Delegation empowers a subordinate to make decisions. It is a shifting of decision-making authority as well as responsibility for the results from one organisational level to another lower one. However, a certain level of accountability for the outcome of the work does remain with the person who delegated the work to begin with.

There are a number of reasons someone may decide to delegate. These include: 
 To free themselves up to do other tasks in the pace of their own 
 To have the most qualified person making the decisions
 To seek another qualified person's perspective on an issue
 To develop someone else's ability to handle the additional assignments judiciously and successfully.

Delegation is widely accepted as an essential element of effective management. It is one of the most useful management tools available. The ability to delegate is a critical, yet difficult to develop, skill in managing effectively. There are a number of factors which facilitate effective delegation by managers. These include: "Recognising and respecting others’ capabilities; evaluating tasks and communicating how they fit in the big picture; matching people and assignments; providing support and encouragement; tolerating ambiguity and uncertainty; interpreting failure as a key to learning". With organisations being such complex and dynamic entities, the success of objectives rely heavily on how effectively tasks and responsibilities can be delegated. There are a number of characteristics which apply to delegation. Firstly, as previously discussed it is the process of assigning authority of a task to a supporting employee. This also shifts the decision-making authority relating to this task. The delegation of tasks across organisational levels creates connections and develops a chain of authority.

The process of delegation 
According to Dr. Kanthi Wijesinghe, Senior Lecturer, National Institute of Education, "Delegation begins when the manager passes on some of their responsibilities to a subordinate. Responsibility is the work assigned to an individual." Delegation is strongly dependent on a supervisor's ability to communicate, motivate and understand individual preferences and differences. The process of delegation involves ensuring that a task and appropriate employee have been selected. The process of delegation requires ‘preparation, initiation, implementation, and closure’. The tasks assigned to an individual should not include those which are a traditional part of their role. While a manager is able to delegate authority to carry out a give task, ultimate responsibility is not transferred. This means that delegation involves a process of sharing, which may include ‘authority, power, influence, information, knowledge, or risk’. This builds trust and morale between managers and subordinates. The internal and external environment of an organisation is often characterised by many interfering factors. Some of these include ‘too much urgency, inexperience, and lack of trust’. In order to minimise the effect of these factors, a clear delegation protocol should be developed and followed within an organisation.  

The process of delegation does not always follow a conformed structure, nor is it straightforward, however there are a number of key aspects which are generally involved. The generalised process of delegation involves some combination of the following:

 Allocation of duties: the delegator communicates to their subordinate the task which is to be performed. Resources are provided and a time limit is informed. 
 Delegation of authority: In order for the subordinate to perform the task, authority is required. The required authority is granted to the employee when the task is delegated. 
 Assignment of responsibilities: When authority is delegated, the subordinate is assigned with the responsibility of this task. When someone is given the rights to complete a task, they are assigned with the corresponding obligation to perform. Responsibility itself cannot be entirely delegated; a manager must still operate under equal responsibility to the delegated authority. 
 Creation of accountability: At the completion of the delegation process, it is essential that the manager creates accountability, meaning that subordinates must be answerable for the tasks which they have been authorised to carry out.

Principles of delegation 
There are a number of guidelines, in the form of principles, which are essential to understanding and implementing the process of delegation. The principles of delegation include:

Principle of result expected 
The authority delegated to an individual subordinate needs to be adequate to ensure their ability to accomplish the results expected of the task. Prior to delegation, the manager needs to know the purpose of such delegation and the results which they expect from it. This means that goals, standards of performance and targets need to be clearly outlined to direct the actions of the subordinate to completion of the task.

Principle of parity of authority and responsibility 
This principle outlines the concept that authority and responsibility co-exist and must go hand-in-hand. This means that the authority which is delegated to an employee must be consistent and equal to that of their responsibility. "Responsibility without authority is meaningless". Each individual in an organisation requires the necessary authorities in order to effectively carry out assigned tasks; disparity should not exist between the responsibility imposed on and the authority granted to an employee in order to carry out a task.

Principle of absoluteness of responsibility 
The principle of absoluteness of responsibility states that delegation of responsibility is not possible. Superiors are unable to relinquish, through the process of delegation, responsibility for the tasks and activities assigned to their subordinates, for they are the ones who delegated this authority and assigned the duty. Responsibility is absolute, with a manager remaining accountable for the actions of their subordinates.

Principle of unity of command 
According to the principle of unity of command, employees should only have one supervisor, who they report to, are granted authority by and receive orders from. This employee should be solely accountable to their direct supervisor. This is associated with increased employee efficiency and less role conflict within an organisation.

The scalar principle 
The scalar principle asserts that there are clear and formal lines of hierarchal authority within an organisation. This hierarchy reflects the flow of authority and responsibility. It clearly outlines to managers and subordinates, who has the power to delegate authority and to whom they are answerable to.

Principle of exception 
This principle asserts that employees should be given complete freedom to fulful their responsibilities within the purview of their authority. Managers should therefore refrain from interfering with the day-today work of their subordinates, even if minor mistakes are recognised. This level of control leads to more efficient results. In some exceptional cases, managers are able to interfere on matters deviating significantly from the norm; in this case the authority delegated to the subordinate may even be withdrawn.

Potential advantages and disadvantages 
Delegation is an essential and extremely useful management tool. When implemented effectively and successfully delegation results in many benefits to the organisation, manager and subordinate. However, if delegation in unsuccessful and not implemented optimally, the results can lead to serious disadvantages and have detrimental effects.

Delegation is one of the best-known methods for efficiently managing time and leads to numerous benefits within an organisation. One of the most significant advantages of delegation is its use for employee motivation and development. The motivating factor associated with delegations comes from the increased confidence transferred from manager to subordinate. When a supervisor demonstrates their confidence it builds staff trust and self-confidence in the employees. There is a highly significant and positive relationship that exists between delegation and trust between an individual employee and management. Leaders are able to empower subordinates through the sharing of supervisor power. This leads to positive reinforcement of the supervisor's role, builds morale and generates organisation trust. Delegation significantly increases effectiveness and efficiency in multiple ways. It eases the challenges relating to management’ workload, increasing responsiveness and growing and developing the capabilities of employees. Organisational resources are managed more efficiently, and subordinates are able to make decisions and perform tasks faster. Through delegation, lower level employees are able to embrace the opportunity to gain experience, build on capabilities and develop skills, which improves the organization. Delegation is positively related to organizational commitment, task performance, innovative behaviour and job satisfaction. At an organisational level, delegation can provide insight into current strengths and weaknesses, providing the opportunity for improvement and growth. It also increases the capacity of an organisation to respond quickly and effectively.

While the benefits are clear, there are a number of potential disadvantages and challenges to effective delegation. Ineffective use of delegation includes allowing no real influence or granting too much authority to someone who is unwilling or unable to make appropriate decisions. Some supervisors find it challenging to delegate tasks for the fear of becoming out of touch with the required skills or giving up something they truly enjoy. Delegation does involve a level of risk and uncertainty, which can be a powerful deterrent to delegation. When supervisors delegate a task, they remain responsible for whether or not it is carried out effectively and must consider the potential risks and rewards as a result of the delegation. Managers are often reluctant to delegate due to concerns that mistakes will be made, or that the job will not be completed to the standard which they believe they could achieve. Another concern relating to delegation is that top-level management can become wary that middle management will delegate for the benefit of their specific needs rather than those general to the organisation.

References 

Management